The Granite Peak Installation (GPI) — also known as Granite Peak Range — was a U.S. biological weapons testing facility located on  of Dugway Proving Ground in Utah. The GPI was a sub-installation of Dugway but had its own facilities, including utilities. Established in 1943, GPI was deactivated with the end of World War II.

History
In October 1943, because of the limitations of a  site at Horn Island off the coast of Mississippi a biological weapons testing site was established at Dugway Proving Ground in Utah. Known as the Granite Peak Installation, the site was activated as the U.S. military's principal bio-weapons testing site beginning in June 1944. Construction on the massive facilities required by GPI began on July 10, 1944, and continued for seven months, finally ending on January 30, 1945. The total cost for the development and construction of GPI was around $1.3 million (equivalent to $ million in ). When World War II ended in 1945 GPI was deactivated and closed.

Mission

Overview
GPI was the U.S. bio-weapons program's main testing site. Granite Peak was a sub-installation of Dugway Proving Ground and many of GPI's administrative task were overseen by the post commander at Dugway. Personnel stationed at the main Dugway grounds cooperated with tests at GPI. For example, air missions were flown by Dugway detachments, and weather forecast data was also provided by personnel at Dugway. Despite the assistance from Dugway, GPI maintained control over all technical aspects of its operations and testing. GPI was overseen by the Special Projects Division, part of the U.S. Army Biological Warfare Laboratories.

Testing
One weapon tested was a 91-pound bomb containing "vegetable killer acid", known as VKA (2,4-Dichlorophenoxyacetic acid), now commonly sold as an ingredient in household "weed n' feed" products. Testing of other munitions continued from 1943–1945, including tests using the causal agent for anthrax. The M33 cluster bomb was used in a series of tests from August–October 1952 at GPI. The Army Chemical Corps exposed over 11,000 guinea pigs to Brucella suis via air-dropped M33s. The guinea pig trials caused one Chemical Corps general to remark, "Now we know what to do if we ever go to war against guinea pigs"

Facilities
Because of this isolation the installation developed many of its own facilities, separate from the main facilities at Dugway. GPI had its own utilities, laboratories, living quarters and medical facility. By 1985 only two surviving structures remained at GPI: a pump house and an underground "igloo storage building".

Utilities at the site included, sewer and septic systems, power plants, and delivery systems for electricity, water and steam. The base was much larger than the BW site at Horn Island.

See also
Fort Detrick
Fort Terry
Horn Island Testing Station
Granite Peak
Gruinard Island
List of military installations in Utah

Notes

References
Regis, Ed. The Biology of Doom: The History of America's Secret Germ Warfare Project, (Google Books), Macmillan, 2000,.

Military installations in Utah
Biological warfare facilities
Research installations of the United States Army
Buildings and structures in Tooele County, Utah
Formerly Used Defense Sites in Utah
1943 establishments in Utah
United States biological weapons program
Military installations closed in the 1940s